Liquid Love: On the Frailty of Human Bonds is a 2003 book by Zygmunt Bauman which discusses human relations in liquid modern (post-modern) world. The book is part of series of books written by Bauman, such as Liquid Life and Liquid Times.

Chapters
The book is divided into four chapters as below:
Falling In and Out of Love
In and Out of the Toolbox of Sociality
On the Difficulty of Loving Thy Neighbour
Togetherness Dismantled

Reviews
According to Alek Tarkowski the book is a difficult read as the thought is disorganized and that is divided into four autonomous parts.

References

2003 non-fiction books
Books by Zygmunt Bauman
Polity (publisher) books